H45 may refer to:
 Hamilton H-45, a six-passenger-seat, all-metal, high-wing monoplane
 HMS Acheron (H45), an A-class destroyer
Koboro Station, a Japanese railway station with code H45